Medieval Kangleipak or Medieval Manipur refers to a long period of history of Manipur between the "ancient period" and the "modern period". It encompasses the 15th century AD to the 19th century AD.

Periods

Early medieval period 

The start of the period is typically taken to be the slow collapse of the Ancient Meitei faith, during the reign of Meidingu Senbi Kiyamba (1467-1507). It was during his reign the Brahmin people migrated to the kingdom and the microscopic volume of Vaishnavism proceeded with the worship of the Pheiya (sacred stone from Pong kingdom) as Hindu God Vishnu.

Late medieval period 

During the reign of Emperor Pamheiba Garib Niwaz (1709-1748), the name of the kingdom was changed from "Kangleipak" into "Manipur". It is during his regime the religion of the entire Meitei ethnicity was forcibly converted from Sanamahism into Hinduism. In 1729 AD, Puya Mei Thaba, the historic burning of the sacred scriptures of Sanamahism took place.

Related pages 

 
 Kuranganayani

Gallery

Sources 

 http://e-pao.net/epSubPageExtractor.asp?src=manipur.History_of_Manipur.History_Of_Medieval_Manipur_1
 http://e-pao.net/epSubPageExtractor.asp?src=manipur.History_of_Manipur.History_Of_Medieval_Manipur_2
 http://e-pao.net/epSubPageExtractor.asp?src=manipur.History_of_Manipur.History_Of_Medieval_Manipur_3
 http://e-pao.net/epSubPageExtractor.asp?src=manipur.Ethnic_Races_Manipur.Origin_of_the_Meiteis_3

Further reading 

 https://www.imphaltimes.com/it-articles/item/15075-hinduism-in-manipur
 https://www.jstor.org/stable/44156597?seq=1
 https://www.jstor.org/stable/44145476?seq=1

References 

History of Manipur
Pages with unreviewed translations